Toss, Tossed or Tossing may refer to:

Places in the canton of Zürich, Switzerland
 Töss, a district of the city of Winterthur
 Töss (river)
 Töss Valley

Film
 Toss (2007 film), an Indian Telugu film
 Toss (2009 film), an Indian Hindi film
 Toss (2017 film), and Indian Kannada film

Other
 Toss Woollaston (1910-1998), New Zealand painter
 Type one secretion system, in biochemistry
 Toss (cricket), a coin flip to determine which team bats first
 Toss, a method of determining the order of play in the table game of Carrom
 Sheaf toss, a traditional Scottish agricultural sport
 Tossed (retail), a London-based healthy food chain
 TOSS (operating system), the Tri-Lab Operating System Stack, a Linux distribution
 "Tossed", a song by Frank Black on his Frank Black (album)
 Toss pillow, another name for a throw pillow
 Vulgar UK slang for masturbation

See also
 Full toss, cricket delivery
 TOS (disambiguation)
 Toss juggling
 Toss bombing, a type of military aerial bombing
 The Tossers, a Celtic punk band from Chicago, Illinois
 TOSS, Company